John Preston (1611–1686), of Tara, served as Mayor of Dublin in 1653–1654. He was born in Tara, Ardsallagh, County Meath, in 1611 the son of Hugh Preston, of Bolton, Lancaster, the grandson of Jenico Preston, 3rd  Viscount Gormanston.

He married Mary Morris (1615–1654) on 21 May 1643 at Bolton, Lancashire, England, with whom he had three children, Mary, Phineas, and Samuel.
Following the death of his wife, he married Katherine Ashburnham, the widow of Sir John Sherlock MP of Littlerath, County Kildare. He married for a third time another widow, Anne Tighe (1655–1700) the daughter of Alderman Richard Tighe (who also served as Mayor of Dublin), who bore him a son also called John Preston, who served as MP in the Irish Parliament for  Meath in 1711–1715.

He was elected alderman on Dublin Corporation in 1650 and served as Mayor of Dublin in 1654 and also served as MP for  Navan in 1661. He founded the Preston Schools in Navan, County Meath and Ballyroan, County Laois in 1686.
He died on 13 July 1686.

References

1611 births
1686 deaths
Lord Mayors of Dublin
Members of the Parliament of Ireland (pre-1801) for County Meath constituencies
Irish MPs 1661–1666